Maicon Douglas Sisenando (born 26 July 1981), known as Maicon, is a Brazilian retired footballer who played as a right-back.

Maicon began his career in his native country with Cruzeiro, after initially playing for Grêmio and Criciúma at youth level. He played 125 times for Cruzeiro between 2000 and 2004, earning one national league title and several other domestic competitions, before moving to Europe when he signed for Ligue 1 side Monaco. After two years in Monaco, he signed for Inter Milan in 2006, where he became an established first team player, going on to win the UEFA Champions League in 2010, four Serie A titles, the FIFA Club World Cup and various domestic competitions. In August 2012, he signed for Manchester City. Maicon failed to secure a regular place in the team, moving back to Italy to play for Roma the following season. He returned to Brazil in 2017, playing for Avaí, Criciúma and Villa Nova. In January 2021, he joined Italian Serie D side Sona, before finishing his career in July of the same year following a brief spell at Sammarinese side Tre Penne.

As a Brazil international, Maicon made his debut in 2003 and represented his nation on 76 occasions, scoring seven goals. He won a runners-up medal at the 2003 CONCACAF Gold Cup, and took part in three Copa América tournaments (winning the competition in 2004 and 2007) and two FIFA World Cups (finishing in fourth-place in 2014 on home soil). He was also a member of the teams that won consecutive FIFA Confederations Cup titles in 2005 and 2009.

Club career

Early career
A talented right-sided wingback, Maicon debuted for Cruzeiro in 2001 and after two successful seasons in Brazil, which included winning a championship and being called up for the Brazil national team in 2003. In June 2004, he was signed by Monaco for £2.1 million.

Inter Milan

2006–2009
In July 2006, Inter Milan officially announced the signing of Maicon for a fee of £4.8 million and a five-year contract, along with fellow Brazilian fullback Maxwell and French midfielder Olivier Dacourt. During his time at Inter, he established himself as a reliable wing-back, solid defensively with an ability of making emphatic runs down the right wing, often setting up goals or scoring himself with his powerful right foot. He overtook Inter captain Javier Zanetti as the first choice right back, with the Argentine moving in midfield. He was generally considered one of the best wing-backs in the game.

During a UEFA Champions League match on 6 March 2007, Maicon was involved in a brawl with Valencia defender David Navarro. Maicon was originally banned for six matches, but the ban was reduced to three. A regular under former coach José Mourinho, he contributed his fair share of assists and goals as Inter won a fourth consecutive title in the 2008–09 season, including a match-winning brace against Siena.

2009–10 season

Maicon continued the good form he displayed in previous seasons during the 2009–10 season; he started the season by scoring a goal against Milan in the 4–0 Derby della Madonnina victory, and then playing well against Barcelona in a 0–0 draw at the San Siro. He subsequently set up Diego Milito on matchday five in Serie A against Napoli, as Inter defeated Napoli 3–1. Maicon continued with his solid performances, notably scoring the last goal in a 5–0 win over Genoa on 17 October and making a fantastic byline run which resulted in Milito's match killing goal in a 5–3 home victory over Palermo two weeks later. In the very next match, he scored a goal against Livorno, where the match ended 2–0 for Inter. During Inter's home leg of the Derby d'Italia, the right back opened the scoring against Juventus with one of the most spectacular goals of the season, juggling a loose ball over the onrushing defender at the top of the penalty box and volleying it into the opposite corner.

Later that month, Maicon scored his first Champions League goal against reigning champions Barcelona when Inter registered a famous victory over the Catalans. He reportedly knocked out a tooth after he collided with Lionel Messi. Having overtaken Roma at the summit of the Serie A and winning the league title, Inter went on to eliminate Barcelona from the Champions League in the semi-finals, with Maicon earning praise. On 22 May 2010, after beating Roma in the Coppa Italia final weeks earlier, Inter won the Champions League, thus obtaining the treble, with a 2–0 victory over Bayern Munich in the final at the Santiago Bernabéu Stadium, Madrid. He was named the 2009–10 UEFA Club Defender of the Year and his performances earned him a nomination for the Ballon d'Or trophy as Europe's top player.

2011–12 season
In the 2011–12 season, Maicon played just 23 games in Serie A. In his 23 appearances Maicon scored two goals, the first in a 2–1 defeat to Juventus at the San Siro on 29 October 2011, and the second in the Derby della Madonnina against Milan in a 4–2 win, on 6 May 2012. He scored from outside the penalty box with a belting shot into the top left corner of Marco Amelia's goal, in a game in which teammate Diego Milito scored a hat-trick.

Manchester City
On 31 August 2012, Maicon signed for Manchester City in a £3 million transfer deal, taking the number 3 shirt. He made his City debut on 15 September in a 1–1 draw against Stoke City. He made his home debut in a 2–1 win against Tottenham Hotspur on 11 November, replacing centre-back Matija Nastasić in the second half. Maicon struggled with injury throughout the season, but when fit he found it a struggle to break into the City team, ultimately failing to dislodge Pablo Zabaleta from the right back position and struggling to even supplant the injury-prone Micah Richards for the substitute right-back role fit. Maicon therefore rarely made City's substitutes' bench. When manager Roberto Mancini was sacked at the end of the season, his replacement Manuel Pellegrini was quick to move the player, omitting him from the club's pre-season tour of South Africa and commenting that he had no plans to include him in the squad.

Roma

On 18 July 2013, Maicon returned to Serie A after Manchester City allowed him to move on a free transfer to Roma. His transfer was made official by Roma on 26 July on his 32nd birthday, with Maicon signing a two-year deal.

Roma started the 2013–14 season under manager Rudi Garcia with ten wins in its first ten Serie A games. He was allocated squad number 13, and made his competitive debut on 25 August in the opening league week against Livorno, playing full-90 minutes in a 0–2 away win. On 25 September, during the away match against Sampdoria, Maicon suffered an muscular injury and was replaced in the 35th minute; following the match, it was reported he had a first degree lesion in the right thigh, and the recovery time was around 15 days. Maicon returned in action for the league match against Napoli, helping the team to win 2–0 at home. Later on 8 December, Maicon scored his first goal for Roma in the 2–1 home win against Fiorentina, returning the team to the winning ways after four consecutive draws.

He started 2014 by scoring his second goal of the season in Roma's 4–0 home defeat of Genoa. Maicon made his Coppa Italia debut nine days later in the quarter-final against Juventus, contributing in a 1–0 home win and progression to the semi-final.

On 13 October 2014, Maicon agreed a contract extension with Roma, extending his stay at Stadio Olimpico until June 2016.

Avaí 

On 31 May 2017, Maicon signed with Brazilian side Avaí on a one-year contract. After training for a few weeks with Botafogo, he didn't sign with the Glorioso, instead going to the club from Santa Catarina. Maicon came back to Brazilian football after 13 years, after leaving Cruzeiro for AS Monaco. In December 2017, Maicon announced his retirement after spending one season with Avaí who were relegated to Série B.

Criciúma 

On 22 December 2018, Maicon announced he had signed a one-year contract with Série B side Criciúma. Maicon cited his son as one of the reasons for his return to football and his previous history with the club as a youth player.

Villa Nova
In September 2020, Maicon joined Campeonato Brasileiro Série D side Villa Nova.

Sona
In January 2021, it was confirmed that Maicon had joined Italian Serie D club Sona on a six-month deal.

Tre Penne
On 14 June 2021, Maicon joined Sammarinese club Tre Penne. During his month-long stay at the club, he made two appearances in the 2021–22 UEFA Europa Conference League first qualifying round.

International career

After appearing for Brazil's under-20 team at the 2001 FIFA World Youth Championship, Maicon made his senior international debut in the team's opening game of the 2003 CONCACAF Gold Cup against Mexico on 12 July 2003. He was named in the team of the tournament as Brazil finished as runner-up.

He went on to become the first choice right-back for the Seleção, winning the Copa América in 2004 and 2007, and the FIFA Confederations Cup in 2005 and 2009. He appeared in his first FIFA World Cup in 2010 and scored on his tournament debut, a 2–1 win over North Korea.

In June 2014, Maicon was selected in Brazil's squad for the 2014 World Cup. He replaced Dani Alves as the team's starting right-back for the 2–1 quarter-final win against Colombia in Fortaleza and for the remainder of the tournament.

On 7 September 2014, Maicon was dismissed from the Brazil squad for an unspecified "internal problem".

Style of play
Due to his work-rate and stamina, Maicon is known to be capable of aiding his team both offensively and defensively, and has been used both as a full-back and as an attacking wing-back or wide midfielder. He is gifted with outstanding physical attributes, athleticism and excellent technical skills, as well as good vision, crossing ability and a powerful shot, which made him a dangerous attacking threat down the right flank in his prime. Due to his success, strength, pace and power, he earned the nickname "Il Colosso" ("The Colossus") during his time at Inter, where he developed into one of the best attacking full-backs in the world, forming a notable partnership with teammate Javier Zanetti.

Career statistics

Club

International

International goals
Brazil score listed first, score column indicates score after each Maicon goal.

Honours

Club
Cruzeiro
Campeonato Brasileiro Série A: 2003
Copa do Brasil: 2003
Campeonato Mineiro: 2002, 2003

Inter Milan
Serie A: 2006–07, 2007–08, 2008–09, 2009–10
Coppa Italia: 2009–10, 2010–11
Supercoppa Italiana: 2006, 2008, 2010
UEFA Champions League: 2009–10
FIFA Club World Cup: 2010

International
Brazil
Copa América: 2004, 2007
FIFA Confederations Cup: 2005, 2009
CONCACAF Gold Cup: Runner-up 2003

Individual
ESM Team of the Year: 2008–09, 2009–10
2009 FIFA Confederations Cup: FIFA.com Users' Top 11
2010 FIFA World Cup Man of the Match: vs Korea DPR (GM)
2010 FIFA World Cup: Dream Team
UEFA Club Defender of the Year: 2009–10
FIFA FIFPro World XI: 2010
UEFA Team of the Year: 2010
Samba d'Or: 2010
 CONCACAF Gold Cup Best XI: 2003
Inter Milan Hall of Fame: 2022

Personal life
Maicon is a great-nephew of former Brazil international footballer Valdomiro.

References

External links

 
 
 
 Profile at AS Roma website
 Profile at SoccerSurfer.com

1981 births
Living people
People from Novo Hamburgo
Brazilian footballers
Association football fullbacks
Cruzeiro Esporte Clube players
AS Monaco FC players
Inter Milan players
Manchester City F.C. players
A.S. Roma players
Avaí FC players
Criciúma Esporte Clube players
Villa Nova Atlético Clube players
S.P. Tre Penne players
Campeonato Brasileiro Série A players
Campeonato Brasileiro Série B players
Campeonato Brasileiro Série D players
Ligue 1 players
Serie A players
Serie D players
Premier League players
Campionato Sammarinese di Calcio players
Brazil under-20 international footballers
Brazil international footballers
2003 CONCACAF Gold Cup players
2004 Copa América players
2005 FIFA Confederations Cup players
2007 Copa América players
2009 FIFA Confederations Cup players
2010 FIFA World Cup players
2011 Copa América players
2014 FIFA World Cup players
Copa América-winning players
FIFA Confederations Cup-winning players
UEFA Champions League winning players
Brazilian expatriate footballers
Brazilian expatriate sportspeople in Monaco
Brazilian expatriate sportspeople in Italy
Brazilian expatriate sportspeople in England
Brazilian expatriate sportspeople in San Marino
Expatriate footballers in Monaco
Expatriate footballers in Italy
Expatriate footballers in England
Expatriate footballers in San Marino
Sportspeople from Rio Grande do Sul